The Kenya Bureau of Standards (KEBS) is a government agency responsible for governing and maintaining the standards and practices of metrology in Kenya.  It was established by an Act of Parliament of Kenya's National Assembly, The Standard Act, and Chapter 496 of the Laws of Kenya. The Bureau started its operations in July 1974.  It has main offices in Nairobi, by Raila Amolo Odinga and others. It has  regional offices throughout Kenya.

The KEBS Board of Directors is known as the National Standards Council ("NSC") and is the policy-making body for supervising and controlling the administration and financial management of the Bureau. The Bureau's chief executive is the Managing Director.

The aims and objectives of KEBS include preparation of standards relating to products, measurements, materials, processes, etc. and their promotion at national, regional and international levels; certification of industrial products; assistance in the production of quality goods; quality inspection of imports at ports of entry; improvement of measurement accuracies and dissemination of information relating to standards.

To keep close liaison with and render efficient service to industry, trade and commerce in different parts of the country, KEBS has opened Regional Offices in Mombasa, Kisumu, Nakuru, Garissa, Nyeri and has import inspection offices at all the legal points of entry in Kenya.

KEBS is a member of the International Organization for Standardization (ISO).
The main functions of KEBS are as follows:
 Promote standardization in industry and commerce
 Provide facilities for examination and testing commodities manufactured in Kenya
 Test goods destined for exports for purposes of certification
 Prepare, frame or amend specification and codes of practice

See also
 Bureau of Standards
 Metric system
 Metrology

References

External links 
Kenya Bureau of Standards

ISO member bodies
Government agencies of Kenya
Standards organisations in Kenya
1974 establishments in Kenya
Organisations based in Nairobi